The Fire Services Act 1947  was an Act of Parliament of the United Kingdom that reorganised fire services in the United Kingdom. It disbanded the National Fire Service and returned the responsibility for running fire services to local authorities.

General Arrangement of the Act
ss. 1 to  3 Provision of fire services
ss. 4 to 12 Fire Authorities
ss.13 to 16 Supply of water for fire-fighting
ss.17 to 25 Administrative provisions
ss.26 to 28 Pensions etc.
ss.29 to 39 Miscellaneous and General
First to Sixth Schedules

Extent and Repeals
While the original Act did not contain an "Extent" section, the Preamble and text addressed Great Britain (and parts thereof) only.

England and Wales
The Fire Services Act 1947 was entirely repealed in England and Wales by the Fire and Rescue Services Act 2004, now the primary legislation for England and Wales.

Scotland
The Fire and Rescue Services Act 2004 extended only to England and Wales, thus leaving the Fire Services Act 1947 in force in Scotland. Most of the 1947 Act was later repealed by the Fire (Scotland) Act 2005, which left  ss. 26 to 27A (concerning the Firemen's Pension Scheme) still in force in Scotland.

Northern Ireland
The Act does not extend to Northern Ireland.

See also
Fire services in Scotland
Fire service in the UK
History of fire safety legislation in the United Kingdom
History of fire brigades in the United Kingdom

References

External links
 

1947 in Scotland
United Kingdom Acts of Parliament 1947
Acts of the Parliament of the United Kingdom concerning Scotland
Fire and rescue in the United Kingdom